Demequina mangrovi is a Gram-positive bacterium from the genus Demequina which has been isolated from rhizospheric soil of the mangrove plant Bruguiera gymnorhiza.

References

Micrococcales
Bacteria described in 2012